Still Life with Sweets is a 1676 oil on canvas painting by the Portuguese artist Josefa de Óbidos in the municipal collection of Santarém, Portugal.

This painting shows a sumptuous display of sweets in various pottery containers and in the center a silver sugar holder with a gold spoon emphasizes the wealth of this dessert spread. Far from normal, such a spread would have been beyond reach of most townspeople and the artist herself at that time and was either meant to represent an ideal holiday feast or was commissioned by a wealthy patron. The "Bodegón" style is reminiscent of earlier dessert displays by Juan van der Hamen and others of the Spanish school a generation before her. 

This painting is a pendant of Still Life with Sweets and Flowers in the same collection:

References

External links
artwork record on Europeana website

1676 paintings
Paintings in Portugal